Javon Patterson (born July 8, 1997) is an American football center who is a free agent. He played college football at Ole Miss.

Professional career

Indianapolis Colts
Patterson was drafted by the Indianapolis Colts in the seventh round, 246th overall, of the 2019 NFL Draft.

On June 4, 2019, Colts head coach Frank Reich announced that Patterson had torn his anterior cruciate ligament. Patterson missed the entire 2019 season as a result of the injury.

Patterson was waived by the Colts on September 5, 2020, as part of their roster cuts.

New York Giants
On September 23, 2020, Patterson was signed to the New York Giants practice squad. He was released on October 27.

Cleveland Browns
On November 10, 2020, Patterson was signed to the Cleveland Browns' practice squad. He was elevated to the active roster on December 26 for the team's week 16 game against the New York Jets, and reverted to the practice squad after the game. He was placed on the practice squad/COVID-19 list by the team on December 30, 2020, and restored to the practice squad on January 8, 2021.

Patterson signed a reserve/futures contract with the Browns after the season on January 18, 2021. Patterson was waived by the Browns on August 31, 2021.

Denver Broncos
On September 29, 2021, Patterson was signed to the Denver Broncos practice squad. He was released on October 26. He was re-signed on December 24, but released three days later.

References

1997 births
Living people
People from Petal, Mississippi
Players of American football from Mississippi
American football centers
Ole Miss Rebels football players
Indianapolis Colts players
New York Giants players
Cleveland Browns players
Denver Broncos players